Thiruvarur district is one of the 38 districts in the Tamil Nadu state of India.  As of 2011, the district had a population of 1,264,277 with a sex-ratio of 1,017 females for every 1,000 males.

Geography 
The district occupies an area of 2,161 km². The district is bounded by Nagapattinam district on the east, Mayiladuthurai district on the north, Thanjavur District on the west, Palk Strait on the south and a small border on the northeast with the Karaikal district of the union territory Puducherry.

Demographics

According to 2011 census, Thiruvarur district had a population of 1,264,277 with a sex-ratio of 1,017 females for every 1,000 males, much above the national average of 929. 20.39% of the population lived in urban areas. A total of 121,973 were under the age of six, constituting 62,280 males and 59,693 females. Scheduled Castes and Scheduled Tribes accounted for 34.08% and 0.24% of the population respectively. The average literacy of the district was 74.86%, compared to the national average of 72.99%. The district had a total of 327,219 households. There were a total of 540,168 workers, comprising 60,508 cultivators, 200,126 main agricultural labourers, 7,264 in house hold industries, 144,527 other workers, 127,743 marginal workers, 9,375 marginal cultivators, 95,062 marginal agricultural labourers, 3,176 marginal workers in household industries and 20,130 other marginal workers.

Tamil is the predominant language spoken by 99.40% of the population.

History

The Thiruvarur district, along with the Nagapattinam district was part of the Thanjavur District before 1991. After that, the present Taluks of Thiruvarur district and Nagapattinam district were separated from the Thanjavur District, and formed the Nagapattinam district. The present Thiruvarur district was formed in 1997 by bifurcating the then Nagapattinam District and joined valangaiman taluk of thanjavur district. Major towns are:
Thiruvarur
Mannargudi
Thiruthuraipoondi
Koothanallur
Muthupet
Kudavasal
Needamangalam

Politics  

|}

Administration

Thiruvarur district is made up of Eight taluks:
Kudavasal
Mannargudi
Nannilam
Needamangalam
Thiruthuraipoondi
Thiruvarur
Valangaiman
Koothanallur

Villages

Religion
Nellivananathar Temple
Rathnapureeswarar Temple

See also
List of districts of Tamil Nadu

References

External links 

 Tiruvarur District

 
Districts of Tamil Nadu
1997 establishments in Tamil Nadu